Md. Zahid Ahsan Russel (born 1 January 1978) is a Bangladesh Awami League politician and the incumbent Jatiya Sangsad member representing the Gazipur-2 constituency. He is also the incumbent State Minister for Youth and Sports. His father, Ahsanullah Master, was a former representative of the same constituency.

Birth and education
Russel was born on 1 January 1978 to Ahsanullah Master and mother Farida Ahsan in Noagaon area under the Tongi Police Station of Gazipur District. His permanent residence is in the village of Hyderabad in Gazipur. He was married to Khadiza Russel. Ahsanullah was elected a member of the parliament from Bangladesh Awami League in Gazipur-2. Russel earned his B.S.S. degree. He is currently studying LLB Honors at 	University of Wolverhampton in the UK.

Political career
After his father's assassination, Russel was elected the youngest member of the parliament from by-election. He also worked in the eighth parliament as member of the Standing Committee on Ministry of Industries. He was elected parliament member by getting the 2nd highest votes by the nomination of Bangladesh Awami League in the 9th parliamentary election on 29 December 2008. In the ninth parliament, He was nominated as the chairman of the Standing Committee on the Ministry of Youth and Sports. He was also a member of the Library Committee as well as a member of the Security Committee of the National Parliament. He is currently a syndicate member of Bangabandhu Sheikh Mujibur Rahman Agricultural University and formerly a Senate member of Jahangirnagar University. He was elected as a Member of the Parliament for third time by the nomination of Bangladesh Awami League in the 10th parliamentary elections in January 2014 and again nominated as the Chairman of the Standing Committee on the Ministry of Youth and Sports. He has elected to  the parliament for the  fourth time in December 2019 and took over the charge of State Minister for the Ministry of Youth and Sports of the government.

Personal life
Russel already established many schools and colleges. Beside these, he has been playing a vital role in the development activities of various organizations including construction of roads, bridges, culverts, hospitals, schools, colleges, madrasa , mosques, temples, churches and graveyards. He has built a new stadium in Tongi named Shahid Ahsan Ullah Master Stadium and renovated Shahid Barkat Stadium in Gazipur.

References

Living people
1978 births
Awami League politicians
8th Jatiya Sangsad members
9th Jatiya Sangsad members
10th Jatiya Sangsad members
11th Jatiya Sangsad members
State Ministers of Youth and Sports (Bangladesh)
Place of birth missing (living people)